Wyoming has the thirty-sixth highest per capita income in the United States of America, at $19,134 (2000).  Its personal per capita income is $32,808 (2003).

Wyoming counties ranked by per capita income

Note: Data is from the 2010 United States Census Data and the 2006-2010 American Community Survey 5-Year Estimates.

References

United States locations by per capita income
Locations
Income